Pauli Pauli (born 4 August 1994) is an Australian professional rugby league footballer who plays as a  or  forward for the York Knights in the Betfred Championship. 

He previously played for the Parramatta Eels and the Newcastle Knights in the NRL. Pauli played for Wakefield Trinity in the Super League and spent time in 2019 on loan from Wakefield at the Salford Red Devils in the Super League. He also has played for the New South Wales City side.

Background
Pauli was born in Silverdale, New South Wales, Australia, and is of Samoan descent. 

He played his junior rugby league for the Hills District Bulls, before being signed by the Parramatta Eels.

Playing career

Early career
From 2012 to 2014, Pauli played for the Parramatta Eels' NYC team. In August 2012, he played for the Australian Schoolboys. On 5 July 2013, he re-signed with the Eels on a 2-year contract.

2014
In February, Pauli played for the Eels in the inaugural NRL Auckland Nines. In Round 4 , he made his NRL debut for the Eels against the Penrith Panthers, playing off the interchange bench in the Eels' 32-16 win at Parramatta Stadium. In Round 8 against the North Queensland Cowboys at 1300SMILES Stadium, he scored his first NRL career try in the Eels' 14-42 loss. On 3 May 2014, he played for the New South Wales under-20s team against the Queensland under-20s team, playing in New South Wales' 30-8 win at Penrith Stadium. He finished off his debut year in the NRL having played in 17 matches and scoring 3 tries for the Eels. On 8 September 2014, he was named in the Samoa train-on squad for the 2014 Four Nations, but did not make the final 23-man squad.

2015
On 31 January and 1 February, Pauli again played in the NRL Auckland Nines. On 11 July, he re-signed with the Eels on a 2-year contract. He finished off the 2015 season having played in 16 matches for the Eels.

2016
On 29 January, Pauli signed a 2-year contract with the Newcastle Knights starting effective immediately, after being released from the final 2 years of his Eels contract. In February, he played for the Knights in the 2016 NRL Auckland Nines.
 
In Round 1, he made his club debut for the Knights against the Gold Coast Titans, playing off the interchange bench in the 12-30 loss at Cbus Super Stadium. In Round 12 against his former club the Eels, he scored his first try for the Knights. He finished the 2016 season having played in 15 matches and scoring 1 try.

2017
Pauli was involved in a seven-car pileup on the M1 Pacific Motorway on 18 January 2017, suffering a dislocated hip and was taken to Gosford Hospital.

Whilst continuing his recovery, he featured for the Newcastle side in the Intrust Super Premiership NSW.

Pauli made his representative debut for the New South Wales City side in the final City vs Country Origin match.

After continuing to build up fitness in the Intrust Super Premiership NSW, Pauli's season was ended in July after fracturing his fibula in a match. The injury prevented him from playing another game for the Knights as he was not offered a new contract beyond 2017.

On 22 November 2017, it was announced that Pauli had signed a one-year contract with English Super League side Wakefield Trinity with the option of extending for a further season.

2019
On 14 May 2019, Pauli joined fellow Super League team Salford Red Devils on a months loan, swapping with Salford Junior Sau

He joined the Salford Red Devils ahead of the 2020 Super League season.

2020
On 17 October 2020, he played in the 2020 Challenge Cup Final defeat for Salford against Leeds at Wembley Stadium.

2021
On 25 June 2021 he played for the Combined Nations All Stars in their 26-24 victory over England, staged at the Halliwell Jones Stadium, Warrington, as part of England’s 2021 Rugby League World Cup preparation.

2022
On 25 October 2021, it was reported that he had signed for York RLFC in the RFL Championship

References

External links

Wakefield Trinity profile
Newcastle Knights profile
NRL profile
SL profile

1994 births
Living people
Australian sportspeople of Samoan descent
Australian expatriate sportspeople in England
Australian rugby league players
Combined Nationalities rugby league team players
New South Wales City Origin rugby league team players
Newcastle Knights players
Parramatta Eels players
Rugby league players from New South Wales
Rugby league props
Rugby league second-rows
Salford Red Devils players
Wakefield Trinity players
Wentworthville Magpies players
York City Knights players